Théziers is a commune in the Gard department in the Occitanie region in southern France.

History
Théziers was founded in the 6th century BC by Greek colonists, who, after they had founded the coastal town of Marseille (Greek: Μασσαλία), advanced inland to found smaller colonies in the periphery. The ancient name of the town was Tedusia (Greek: Θεδουσία), under which the town was known during the Roman times. It was a fortified settlement situated on a hill, which was captured by the Celts during their invasions in the 2nd century BC. Gradually the Romans occupied the Gaul and expelled the Celts, while the settlement evolved as a Gallo-Roman village.

Population

See also
Communes of the Gard department

References

Communes of Gard